Phloeomyzinae is a subfamily of the family Aphididae.

Genera 
†Dongbeiaphis Hong, 2002
†Eocylindrites Hong, 2002
†Eophloeomyzus Hong, 2002
†Orbitaphis Hong, 2002
Phloeomyzus de Horváth, 1896

References

Aphididae
Hemiptera subfamilies